, commonly referred to as Tochigi SC (栃木SC, Tochigi Esushi) is a Japanese football club based in Utsunomiya, Tochigi Prefecture, Japan. They currently play in the J2 League, Japan's second tier of professional football.

History 
Teachers in Tochigi Prefecture founded the club in 1953. They were initially called self-explanatory Tochigi Teachers' Soccer Club (栃木教員サッカー部 Tochigi Kyōin Sakkā Bu). They started to welcome players with other professions in 1994 and renamed themselves as Tochigi Soccer Club. In 1999, Tochigi won the Kanto Regional League and were promoted to the Japan Football League after finishing runners-up in the Regional League play-off. In March 2005, they announced that they would set up a task force to give a serious consideration to turn professional and try to gain J.League status.

In January 2007 they achieved J.League Associate Membership status and in the 2008 season they secured qualification for promotion to professional status on November 16; on December 1 promotion was made official by J.League and Tochigi had competed in J2 from 2009.
In 2015 Tochigi finished bottom and were relegated for the first time to J3, the third and lowest professional level in the league system. After two seasons, they returned to J2 as runners-up in 2017.

League and cup record 

Key

Current squad 
As of 9 January 2023.

Coaching staff 
For the 2023 season.

Managerial history

Kit evolution 
The team's colour is yellow.

References

External links 
 Official Website 

 
Association football clubs established in 1953
J.League clubs
Football clubs in Japan
Sports teams in Tochigi Prefecture
1953 establishments in Japan
Japan Football League clubs